Sambhu Sing Mallah is a Bharatiya Janata Party politician from Assam. He has been elected in Assam Legislative Assembly election in 1996 and 2006 from Ratabari constituency.

References 

Living people
Bharatiya Janata Party politicians from Assam
21st-century Indian politicians
Members of the Assam Legislative Assembly
People from Karimganj district
Year of birth missing (living people)